Quijano is a surname. Notable people with the surname include:

Anibal Quijano (born 1928), Peruvian sociologist and humanist thinker
Annette Quijano, American Democratic Party politician
Carlos Quijano, Uruguayan lawyer, politician, essayist and journalist
Diana Quijano (born 1962), Peruvian actress
Douglas Quijano (1944–2009), talent manager
Elaine Quijano (born 1974), American journalist
Fernando Quijano (1805–1871), Uruguayan songwriter
Gedeon G. Quijano (1910–1989), American physician, lawyer, engineer and writer
Hortensio Quijano (1884–1952), Vice President of Argentina, 1946–52
Marvin Quijano (born 1979), Salvadoran football player

Fictional characters 
Alonso Quijano, real name of Don Quijote, leading character of the novel Don Quijote de la Mancha

See also
Café Quijano, Spanish pop band formed by three brothers, Manuel, Óscar and Raúl Quijano
Campo Quijano, town and municipality in Salta Province in northwestern Argentina